Andrew Bruce Tully (born 26 May 1987) is a former British speedway rider.

Speedway career
He rode in the top tier of British speedway riding for the Peterborough Panthers during the 2009 Elite League speedway season. He began his British career riding for Edinburgh Monarchs in 2008. He reached the final of the 2010 British Speedway Championship.

References 

1987 births
Living people
British speedway riders
Edinburgh Monarchs riders
Peterborough Panthers riders